Sweetness is one of the five basic tastes.

Sweetness may also refer to:
 Sweetness of wine
 "Sweetness" (Terence Trent D'Arby song)
 "Sweetness" (Fischerspooner song)
 "Sweetness" (Michelle Gayle song) (1994)
 "Sweetness" (Jimmy Eat World song) (2002)
 "Sweetness" (Lili Haydn song)
 "Sweetness" (Misia song) (1999)
 "Sweetness" (Toadies song)
 "Sweetness" (Umphrey's McGee song)
 "Sweetness" (The Waifs song)
 "Sweetness" (Yes song)
 Sweetness (novel), a 1995 novel by Torgny Lindgren
 Walter Payton or Sweetness (1954–1999), American football player
 Sweetness, a character in Roll Bounce

See also
 Sweet (disambiguation)
 Swete, a surname